Football Club Seattle Storm, also known as the F.C. Seattle Storm, was an American soccer team based in Seattle, Washington.  F.C. Seattle was a "super club" created to provide Seattle players an opportunity to play at a higher level than the local recreational and semi-pro leagues.  In addition to playing exhibition matches against top international teams, F.C. Seattle was a member of the short lived Western Soccer Alliance, was a founding member of the American Professional Soccer League and later spent three seasons in the Pacific Coast Soccer League.

History

1984: F.C. Seattle Challenge
In 1984, F.C. Seattle hosted the F.C. Seattle Challenge '84.  This series pitted F.C. Seattle against three NASL teams, the Vancouver Whitecaps (2–2 tie), Minnesota Strikers (0–3 loss), New York Cosmos (1–2 loss), as well as the 1984 U.S. Olympic Team.  For this challenge cup, the team filled its roster from local colleges, high schools and semi-pro teams.  However, five F.C. Seattle players had previous professional experience: Jack Brand, Jerry Cameron, Eddie Krueger, Joe James and Robbie Zipp.  The team was coached by former Sounders player Tom Jenkins and played its games in Seattle's Memorial Stadium. The series averaged just over six thousand fans per game.  At the end of it, NASL officials approached F.C. Seattle about entering the NASL for the 1985 season.  F.C. Seattle declined, noting that most NASL teams hemorrhaged money.  The club's backers preferred to keep it on a semi-professional basis, build a fan base, then work towards taking the team fully professional an indeterminate time in the future.

1985: Western Alliance Challenge Series
In 1985, F.C. Seattle joined with three other independent "super clubs", F.C. Portland, San Jose Earthquakes and Victoria Riptides, to create the Western Alliance Challenge Series.  This series came in response to the cancellation of games F.C. Seattle had scheduled against English teams West Bromwich Albion and Aston Villa.  In June, FIFA had banned English clubs from travelling for international games after Liverpool fans sparked massive deaths in fan violence in Belgium.

F.C. Portland hosted F.C. Seattle for the first game of the series, a game F.C. Seattle won on the strength of a Bruce Raney hat trick.  Other significant F.C. Seattle players included Jeff Durgan, the Schmetzer brothers - Andy, Brian and Walter, and Peter Hattrup.  However, Bruce Rioch, who had replaced Jack Brand as head coach in February, released Durgan from the team after he was ejected for making several flagrant fouls in the game against the Canadian national team in July.

1986–1989:  Western Soccer Alliance/League
In 1986, three of the four teams from 1985, decided to form the Western Soccer Alliance.  Only Victoria declined to join the new alliance, but they were replaced by the Edmonton Brick Men.

In 1987, the WSA instituted a two-game post-season playoff series.  F.C. Seattle, which finished second in alliance standings, lost 3–0 to the San Jose Earthquakes in the wild card game.

Up to now F.C. Seattle had also been known as the F.C. Seattle Storm.  In 1988, the team officially dropped the F.C. and became the Seattle Storm.  However, they were still referred to as the F.C. Seattle Storm throughout the season and the new name was not widely used until the 1989 season.  The 1988 season was one of the most successful for the Storm when it cruised to the top of the regular season standings, then crushed the Earthquakes 5–0 in the championship game.

In 1989, the Storm failed to build on its previous year's success and finished out of playoff contention.  As a side note, the WSA changed its name to the Western Soccer League.

1990: American Professional Soccer League
In 1990, the Storm, along with the rest of the WSL merged with the American Soccer League to form the American Professional Soccer League.  Despite Chance Fry leading the league with 17 goals and 5 assists, the Storm finished last in the North Division of the West Conference.  Following the season, Greer announced his intention to have the Storm sit out the 1991 season. However, in February 1992, he decided to fold the team.

1993–1995: Pacific Coast Soccer League
In December 1992, Stuart Lee bought the rights to the team and entered it in the amateur Pacific Coast Soccer League. The team competed through the 1995 season then withdrew from senior competitions.  It continues to operate as a local soccer club with boys and girls teams in all age competitions.

Yearly record

Ownership and staff
 Bud Greer - Chairman
 William C. Sage - President / General Manager

Coaches
Record includes both league and exhibition matches.

Notable players
This list includes those former players who received international caps while playing for the team, made significant contributions to the team in terms of appearances or goals, or who made significant contributions to the sport either before they played for the team, or after they left.

  Scott Benedetti
  Rick Davis
  Jeff Durgan
  Chance Fry
  Brent Goulet
  Peter Hattrup
  Chris Henderson
  Eddie Henderson
  Bernie James
  Billy Crook
  Rick Blubaugh
  Brian Schmetzer
  Jeff Stock
  Wade Webber

Exhibition games
As an independent soccer team, F.C. Seattle original purpose was to play exhibition games.  Even after the establishment of the Western Soccer Alliance, exhibition games remained one of the most significant elements of the team's seasons.

1984

1985 results
June 2: Dundee F.C. 0–1
June 9: Santos 2–1
June 16: Guadalajara 2–3
June 23: US National Team 2–3

1986
April 24: Canadian national team 2–3
May 27:  Manchester City 0–1
June 6:  Dundee F.C. 1–2
July 19:  SC Cleveland 2–1

1987
May 31:  Hearts 1–1
June 5:  Norwich City 2–0
June 20:  Neza, Mexico City
July 10: Herfølge 2–1
July 15: Vancouver Whitecaps 0–1
Stormin the Isles Tour of Britain:
July 27:  Middlesbrough 1–2
July 29:  AFC Bournemouth 0–1
July 31:  Queens Park Rangers F.C. 2–2
August 4:  Dundee 0–3
August 6:  Portsmouth 1–3

1988
May 7: Calgary Strikers 3–1
June 11:  Middlesbrough 2–1
June 26:  Atlante
August 3: Oldham Athletic 0–2
August 6: Lincoln City F.C. 2–2
August 10: Middlesbrough 0–3
August 13: Sunderland F.C. 0–3
August 16: Hull F.C. 2–2

1989
May 7:  Vancouver 86ers 2–1
August 3:  Victoria Vistas 3–0

1990
May 5: Victoria Vistas 3–0
May 20:  AFC Bournemouth 1–0
May 29:  Dnepr 1–2
August 1:  at Victoria Vistas 1–0
August 5:  at Vancouver 86ers 5–3
August 8:  Vancouver 86ers 3–2

All time roster (1984–1990)

Goalkeepers

 Jack Brand: 1984
 Sergio Soriano: 1984
 Mark Schuur: 1985-1986, 1988
 Bill Glandon: 1986
 Jeff Koch: 1986-1989
 Jeff Storrs: 1987-1990
 Mark Berry: 1987
 Rolf Norton: 1988-1989
 Jim Neighbors: 1988
 Matthew Olson: 1989
 Chris Bell: 1990
 Jim Brazeau: 1990

Defenders

 Doug Backous: 1984
 Pat Blann: 1984
 Dave Felt: 1984
 Eddie Krueger: 1984
 Terry McGill: 1984
 Steve Englebrick: 1984-1985
 Robbie Zipp: 1984-1985
 Rick Blubaugh: 1984, 1986-1989
 Joe James: 1984, 1989
 Jeff Durgan: 1985
 Don Farler: 1985-1990
 Peter Fewing: 1985-1990
 Dan Pingrey: 1985
 Tom Blahous: 1986-1987
 Daryl Green: 1986-1989
 James Hodgson: 1986
 Kevin Iverson: 1986
 Dave Wittrell: 1986
 Randy Hanson: 1987
 Kevin O’Keefe: 1987
 Jeff Stock: 1987-1989
 Billy Crook: 1988
 Grant Gibbs: 1988-1990
 Rob Goff: 1988, 1989
 Bernie James: 1988-1989
 Ray Evans: 1989
 Steve McCrath: 1989-1990
 Bob McLaughlin: 1989
 Ian MacLean: 1989
 Craig Ottosen: 1989
 Wade Webber: 1990
 Garrett Smith: 1990

Midfielders

 Jerry Cameron: 1984
 Teddy Mitalas: 1984
 Tad Willoughby: 1984, 1986-1989
 Ken Fuegmann: 1985-1988
 Dennis Gunnell: 1985-1988
 Andy Schmetzer: 1985
 Brian Schmetzer: 1985
 Rob Fossett: 1985-1986
 Peter Hattrup: 1986, 1988-1989
 Geoff Wall: 1986, 1987, 1988
 Ken Coplin: 1987, 1989
 John Hamel: 1987-1990
 Fran O’Brien: 1988-1990
 Ralph Black: 1989
 Rick Davis: 1989
 Chris Henderson: 1989
 Jimmy McAlister: 1989
 Jim Weber: 1990
 Robb Sakamoto: 1990
 James Forgette: 1990

Forwards

 Eric Knapp: 1984
 Sasha Shefts: 1984
 Gerard McGlynn: 1984-1985
 Tom Blahous: 1984-1985
 Mike Hiatt: 1984-1985
 Bruce Raney: 1984-1986
 Sean Connors: 1985
 Walt Schmetzer: 1985
 Eric Guise: 1986-1987
 Gary Hunter: 1986
 Sean McGlynn: 1986, 1987
 Sean Connors: 1987
 Mike Enneking: 1987
 Chance Fry: 1987-1990
 Mark Peterson: 1987
 Eddie Henderson: 1988-1990
 Clint Carnell: 1989
 Brent Goulet: 1989
 Gary Heale: 1989
 John Klein: 1989
 Scott Benedetti: 1990
 Jason Russ: 1990
 Chris Saari: 1990

References

External links
GOALSeattle.com FC Seattle Museum Pages

Soccer clubs in Seattle
Defunct soccer clubs in Washington (state)
Western Soccer Alliance teams
American Professional Soccer League teams
Pacific Coast Soccer League teams
1984 establishments in Washington (state)
1995 disestablishments in Washington (state)
Association football clubs disestablished in 1995
Association football clubs established in 1984